The 2015 World Modern Pentathlon Championships was held in Berlin, Germany from 28 June to 6 July 2015. The event included pistol shooting, fencing, 200m swimming, show jumping and a 3 km run.

Medal summary

Men's events

Women's events

Mixed events

  Russian team originally won silver medals but was disqualified due to anti-doping rules violation by Maksim Kustov.
  Russian team originally won silver medals but was disqualified due to anti-doping rules violation by Maksim Kustov.

Medal table

See also
 Union Internationale de Pentathlon Moderne (UIPM)

References

External links
 Results

2015 in modern pentathlon
World Modern Pentathlon Championships
International sports competitions hosted by Germany
Modern pentathlon in Europe
Sports competitions in Berlin
World Modern Pentathlon Championships
World Modern Pentathlon Championships